The 1868 Connecticut gubernatorial election was held on April 6, 1868. It was the first of four consecutive contests between the same two men. Incumbent governor and Democratic nominee James E. English defeated Republican nominee Marshall Jewell with 50.88% of the vote.

General election

Candidates
Major party candidates

James E. English, Democratic
Marshall Jewell, Republican

Results

References

1868
Connecticut
Gubernatorial